Utsira is an island in Rogaland county, Norway.  Utsira Church and Utsira Lighthouse are located on the island.

The  island makes up almost all of Utsira municipality. The island is only connected to the mainland by ferry. There are four regular ferry routes connecting the island to the town of Haugesund each day. The ferries are operated by Rutebåten Utsira.

Most of the island's population lives in the central valley that runs north-south on the island.  There are about 200 residents of the island.

Utsira is known as the best birding site in Norway. There have been 317 different species recorded on Utsira.

The island gives its name to the Shipping Forecast areas of North and South Utsire (the name of the island was spelled Utsire between 1875–1924).

The island website www.utsira.no

See also
List of islands of Norway

References

Islands of Rogaland
Utsira
Islands of the North Sea